Yashwant Sinha (born 6 November 1937) is an Indian administrator and politician. He served as the Minister of Finance from 1990 until 1991 under Prime Minister Chandra Shekhar and again from March 1998 to July 2002 under Prime Minister Atal Bihari Vajpayee. He also served as the Minister of External Affairs from July 2002 until May 2004. He was a senior leader of the BJP before he left the party on 21 April 2018.

In March 2021, he joined the AITC; however he left in June 2022 as he was selected by the Combined Opposition Parties as their Presidential Candidate for the 2022 Presidential election. But lost the election against Droupadi Murmu of NDA.

Early life 
Sinha was born in a Kayastha family in Patna, Bihar. He graduated from University of Patna in BA Hons(History).He received his master's degree in political science in 1958. Subsequently, he taught the subject at the University of Patna until 1962.

Civil Service career 
Sinha joined the Indian Administrative Service in 1960 and spent over 24 years holding important posts during his service tenure. He served as Sub-Divisional Magistrate and District Magistrate for 4 years. He was Under Secretary and Deputy Secretary in the Finance Department of the Bihar Government for 2 years after which he worked in the Ministry of Commerce as Deputy Secretary to the Government of India.

From 1971 to 1973, he was First Secretary (Commercial) in the Indian Embassy, Bonn, West Germany. Subsequently, he worked as Consul General of India in Frankfurt from 1973 to 1974. After working for over seven years in this field, he acquired experience in matters relating to foreign trade and India's relations with the European Economic Community. Thereafter, he worked in the Department of Industrial Infrastructure, Government of Bihar State and in the Ministry of Industry, Government of India dealing with foreign industrial collaborations, technology imports, intellectual property rights, and industrial approvals.

He later was Joint Secretary to Government of India in the Ministry of Surface Transport from 1980 to 1984, his main responsibilities were road transport, ports, and shipping. He resigned from service in 1984.

Political career

Janata Dal 
Sinha resigned from the Indian Administrative Service in 1984 and joined active politics as a member of the Janata Party. He was appointed All-India General secretary of the party in 1986 and was elected Member of the Rajya Sabha (Upper House of the Indian Parliament) in 1988.

When the Janata Dal was formed in 1989, he was appointed General Secretary of the party. He worked as Minister of Finance from November 1990 to June 1991 in Chandra Shekhar's Cabinet.

BJP 
He became the National Spokesperson of the BJP in June 1996. He was elected to Lok Sabha as a BJP candidate from Hazaribagh in 1998, 1999, and 2009. He was appointed finance minister in March 1998. He was appointed Minister for External Affairs on 1 July 2002. In the Lok Sabha elections of 2004, he was defeated by Bhubneshwar Prasad Mehta of CPI. He re-entered the Parliament in 2005. On 13 June 2009, he resigned from the post of vice-president of BJP. In 2018, he quit the BJP citing the "party's condition" and that "democracy in India is in great danger".

In his autobiography Drohkaal ka Pathik, released in November 2013, former MP Pappu Yadav alleged that three MPs of his Indian Federal Democratic Party got money from the then finance minister Sinha, to join the NDA in 2001.

Also there were allegations against Yashwant Sinha, that he was involved in the UTI scam.

On 4 April 2017, Sinha was detained in Hazaribagh district along with BJP MLA Manish Jaiswal and 150 others after trying to hold a religious procession. On police stopping them, his supporters protested and allegedly threw stones at the police.

TMC and 2022 presidential campaign 
On 13 March 2021, he joined TMC to fight against BJP just before the 2021 West Bengal Assembly Election. On 15 March 2021 he was appointed vice president of the Mamata Banerjee-led party. He was selected unanimously as the President Candidate of the Opposition for 2022 Presidential Election, making him the First AITC leader to be nominated for the President.

Finance minister 

Sinha was the finance minister until 1 July 2002, when he exchanged jobs with foreign minister Jaswant Singh. Sinha, during his tenure, was forced to roll back some of his government's major policy initiatives for which he was much criticised. Still, Sinha is widely credited with pushing through several major reform measures that put the Indian economy on a firm growth trajectory. Among them are lowering of real interest rates, introducing tax deduction for mortgage interest, freeing up the telecommunications sector, helping fund the National Highways Authority, and deregulating the petroleum industry. Sinha is also known for being the first Finance Minister to break the 53-year tradition of presenting the Indian budget at 5 pm local time, a practice held over from British Rule days that sought to present the Indian budget at a time convenient to the British Parliament (1130am GMT) rather than India's Parliament.

Sinha has written a comprehensive account of his years as Finance Minister titled Confessions of a Swadeshi Reformer.

Yashwant Sinha has been accused by opponents, and by other political observers of trying to promote nepotism by nominating his son Jayant Sinha as a successor to contest from Hazaribagh overlooking the interests of many other loyal party workers, though he tried to justify the nomination of his son as a party decision.

Honors 
In 2015, he was awarded Officier de la Légion d’Honneur, the highest civilian distinction of France. It was bestowed upon him in recognition of his work as Union Minister of Finance, Minister of External Foreign Affairs and for his invaluable contribution to international issues.

Personal life 
Sinha was born in a Bihari kayastha family and has a wide range of interests including reading, gardening and meeting people. He has widely travelled and has led a number of political and social delegations. He played a leading role in many negotiations on behalf of India. Sinha's wife is Nilima Sinha, one of India's leading children's writers and President, Association of Writers and Illustrators for Children. They have a daughter, Sharmila, and two sons: Jayant Sinha and Sumant Sinha. Sinha blogs under the title Musings of a Swadeshi Reformer. He has co-authored the book India Unmade with Aditya Sinha.

Electoral performance

References 

1937 births
Living people
Officiers of the Légion d'honneur
Recipients of the Legion of Honour
Indian civil servants
Bihar cadre civil servants
Janata Party politicians
Janata Dal politicians
Bharatiya Janata Party politicians from Jharkhand
Politicians from Patna
Rajya Sabha members from Bihar
India MPs 1999–2004
India MPs 1998–1999
India MPs 2009–2014
Lok Sabha members from Jharkhand
Finance Ministers of India
Ministers for Corporate Affairs
Ministers for External Affairs of India
Leaders of the Opposition in the Bihar Legislative Assembly
Rajya Sabha members from Jharkhand
Bihar MLAs 1995–2000
Politicians from Ranchi
People from Patna
Patna University alumni
Academic staff of Patna University
People involved in the Citizenship Amendment Act protests
Trinamool Congress politicians